The Seventeenth Legislative Assembly of Bihar (Seventeenth Vidhan Sabha of Bihar) was constituted on 23 November 2020 as a result of Bihar Legislative Assembly election, 2020 held between 28 October 2020 to 7 November 2020.

Composition

2020 
Following was the composition of the Bihar Legislative Assembly after 2020 Bihar Legislative Assembly election

2022 
Following is the current composition of the Bihar Legislative Assembly which is after some elected members changed parties, various bye-elections and after Nitish Kumar left NDA and formed alliance with Mahagathbandhan on 10 August 2022.

Members of Legislative Assembly

References

Bihar Legislative Assembly
Bihar